The 2012–13 Chicago Mustangs season was the first season of the new Chicago Mustangs professional indoor soccer club. The Mustangs, a Central Division team in the Professional Arena Soccer League, played their home games in the Grand Sports Arena in Hoffman Estates, Illinois. Nasser Rafidia was the team's general manager. Narciso "Chicho" Cuevas served as head coach until late January 2013 when owner Armando Gamboa assumed the role with Thomas Cahue as his assistant coach.

Season summary
The Mustangs were successful in the regular season, finishing 11–5, but failed to qualify for the postseason in the tough Central Division. The team fared better at home than on the road, winning 7 of 8 home games but splitting the road games with 4 wins and 4 losses. A coaching change late in the season was followed by the team dropping 2 of its 3 final matches.

The Mustangs participated in the 2012–13 United States Open Cup for Arena Soccer. They defeated the Rockford Rampage in the Wild Card round, the Illinois Piasa in the Round of 16, and the Cincinnati Saints of the Premier Arena Soccer League in the Quarter-Finals before falling to the Detroit Waza in the Semi-Finals.

History
The Mustangs are named for the original Chicago Mustangs that was a founding member of the United Soccer Association in 1967 and played in the North American Soccer League (NASL) in 1968 before becoming a semi-pro team in 1969.

Off-field moves

8-year old Melissa Mendoza and her mother, the Mustangs' Director of Marketing, organized a canned food and clothing collection drive dubbed "Mission Melissa". Kicked off with a halftime presentation during the December 15th game against the Illinois Piasa, the drive collects for families in need at the holiday season. The team offered free tickets to any person that donated to the drive.

The team's first two home games had a reported attendance of 459 while the remaining home games each reported an attendance of 299. These numbers were reported by the team for technical reasons and may not represent an accurate count of home attendees.

Roster moves
On November 2, 2012, the Mustangs announced the signing of Jose Omar Santillan, Ruben Omar Tapia, and Miguel Angel Vaca from the Guerreros de Guadalajara of the Liga Mexicana de Fútbol Rapido.

On February 6, 2013, the team submitted its 20-man roster in preparation for the postseason. Included on it were three newly signed midfielders: local Angel Escobedo plus Mexico national team veterans Eduardo Rodrigo Flores and Edgar Quintin Vazquez. Both Vazquez and Flores join four other Mustangs players who spend their summer with Guerreros De Guadalajara in the Liga Mexicana de Fútbol Rapido. Flores is also the brother of Mustangs goalkeeper Jesus Flores.

Awards and honors
On January 1, 2013, the Professional Arena Soccer League named Nestor Hernandez as its Player of the Week. The league cited the rookie midfielder's team-leading scoring efforts, including six goals plus three assists in the previous weekend's two games, in making their decision.

In postseason honors, forward Nestor Hernandez was named to the 2012-13 PASL All-League First Team.

Schedule

Regular season

† Game also counts for US Open Cup, as listed in chart below.

2012–13 US Open Cup for Arena Soccer

Team roster
As of February 6, 2013

These are the 20 players submitted by the team to the league on February 6, 2013, as its final roster for possible postseason play. Other players who spent time on the Mustangs roster during the 2012–13 season include goalkeeper Victor Ayala; forwards Victor Blanco, Edwin Ferrera, Qudus Lawal, David Martinez, and Mario Pinon; midfielders Mario Calleros, Ivan Chino, Rafael Hernandez, Luis Mojica, and Manuel Salcedo; plus defenders Amaury Gasca and Narciso Cuevas Jr.

References

External links
Chicago Mustangs official website

Chicago Mustangs (2012–present)
Chicago Mustangs
Chicago Mustangs season
Chicago Mustangs season